Eleutherodactylus aporostegus (commonly known as the Tiburon burrowing frog) is a species of frog in the family Eleutherodactylidae. It was originally described as subspecies of Eleutherodactylus ruthae, but has been formally recognized as a full species since 2008. It is endemic to the Tiburon Peninsula, Haiti.

Eleutherodactylus aporostegus burrows and lays its eggs underground, which is unusual among Eleutherodactylus.

References

aporostegus
Endemic fauna of Haiti
Amphibians of Haiti